Grossuana is a genus of very small freshwater snails, aquatic gastropod mollusks in the family Hydrobiidae

Species
Species within the genus Grossuana include:
Grossuana angeltsekovi Glöer & Georgiev, 2009
Grossuana aytosensis Georgiev, 2012
Grossuana codreanui
Grossuana derventica Georgiev & Glöer, 2013
Grossuana radostinae Georgiev, 2012
Grossuana serbica Radoman, 1973
Grossuana slavyanica Georgiev & Glöer, 2013
Grossuana thracica Glöer & Georgiev, 2009

References

 Fauna Europaea info

Hydrobiidae